The 1953 All-Eastern football team consists of American football players chosen by various selectors as the best players at each position among the Eastern colleges and universities during the 1953 college football season.

Quarterbacks 
 Pat Stark, Syracuse (UP-1)
 Roger Franz, Fordham (INS-1)

Halfbacks 
 Dick Clasby, Harvard (AP-1 [b], UP-1, INS-1)
 Gene Filipski, Villanova (UP-1)
 Pat Uebel, Army (UP-1)
 Lenny Moore, Penn State (INS-1)
 Richard Lalla, Colgate (AP-1 [b])
 Homer Smith, Princeton (AP-1 [b])
 Robert Epps, Pittsburgh (AP-1 [b])

Fullbacks 
 Joe Varaitis, Penn (INS-1)

Ends 
 Bob Mischak, Army (UP-1, INS-1)
 Dick Deitrick, Pitt (UP-1, INS-1)
 Henry C. Lemire, Holy Cross (AP-1)
 James Garrity Penn State (AP-1)

Tackles 
 Jack Shanafelt, Penn (AP-1, UP-1, INS-1)
 Jack C. Perkins, Navy (AP-1)
 Bob Farris, Army (UP-1)
 Eldred Kraemer, Pitt (INS-1)

Guards 
 Dick Polich, Yale (AP-1, UP-1)
 Stanley Tsapis, Cornell (AP-1)
 Steve Eisenhauer, Navy (UP-1)
 John Cannon, Penn (INS-1)
 Bob Fleck, Syracuse (INS-1)

Center 
 Ted Kukowski, Syracuse (AP-1, UP-1, INS-1)

Key
 AP = Associated Press
 UP = United Press
 INS = International News Service

See also
 1953 College Football All-America Team

References

All-Eastern
All-Eastern college football teams